Frank Sinatra's Greatest Hits, Vol. 2 was Sinatra's second compilation of material released by Reprise Records, which like its predecessor, consisted of singles and songs from movie soundtracks. Vol. 2 picks up where Frank Sinatra's Greatest Hits leaves off, so all of the tracks date from 1968 to 1970, except for "The September of My Years", which dates back to 1965. Though the song "My Way" became Sinatra's signature song, it was not a big hit in the US. In the UK it went to #5 and spent 75 weeks in the Top 40. The highest charting U.S. single in this collection is "Cycles" which peaked at #23. The remaining tracks represent the sound of Sinatra's music in the late 1960s, which was more laid back than his early 1960s swinging tunes, with the B-side "Star!" being a notable exception. Vol. 2 peaked at #88 on the album charts in the summer of 1972 during Sinatra's brief retirement from show business.

UK and European versions, which were released in 1970 under the title Greatest Hits, Vol. II (using a Roman numeral), featured a different cover and lineup of songs. "My Way" and "Love's Been Good To Me" being the only common tracks. Confusingly the original U.S. album was released in France and Italy as Greatest Hits, Vol. 3 in 1973.

Track listing

Personnel
 Frank Sinatra - vocals
 Nelson Riddle - arranger, conductor
 Don Costa
 Gordon Jenkins
 Joseph Scott
 Lennie Hayton

References

1972 greatest hits albums
Frank Sinatra compilation albums
Albums arranged by Nelson Riddle
Albums arranged by Gordon Jenkins
Albums arranged by Don Costa
Albums arranged by Lennie Hayton
Albums produced by Don Costa
Albums produced by Sonny Burke
Reprise Records compilation albums